Roryeuchomyia tigrina is a species of flies in the subfamily Eurychoromyiinae.

Distribution
Brazil, Ecuador.

References

Lauxaniidae
Lauxanioidea genera
Diptera of South America